"Panta Mazi" is an EP and debut release by Greek artist Kostas Martakis released in November 2006 by Sony BMG Greece. All songs are included on his debut album Anatropi which was the following year on July 20, 2007.

Track listing
 "Gi'afto Hirokrotiste tin" (Bisogna Saper Perdere)
 "Nai"
 "Panta Mazi"
 "Thelo Epigondos Diakopes"

Charts

References

Kostas Martakis albums
2006 EPs